William Gager (1555–1622) was an English jurist, now known for his Latin dramas.

William Gager was the son of Gilbert Gager and Thomasina Cordell Gager. He was educated at Westminster School and Christ Church, Oxford.

His works were produced at the University of Oxford, from 1582 to 1592. He was considered one of the major dramatists of the late sixteenth century. Apart from one comedy, Rivales (1582), which has not survived, his works were all Latin tragedies. They include Oedipus (1582), Meleager (1582), Dido (1583) and Ulysses Redux (1592). He stayed closer to the model of Senecan tragedy than other contemporaries, and adapted Seneca's Hippolytus in 1592, with the addition of scenes.

He was also a neo-Latin poet.

Gager is mentioned alongside Shakespeare in Francis Meres' Palladis Tamia or Wits Treasury in the section 'A Comparative discourse of our English poets, with the Greeks, Latine and Italian Poets': "The best Poets for Comedy among the Greeks are these, Menander, Aristophanes, Eupolis Atheniensis, Alexis Terius, Nicostratus, Amipsias Atheniensis, Anaxedrides, Rhodius, Aristonymus, Archippus Atheniensis and Callias Atheniensis; and among the Latines, Plautus, Terence, Naeuius, Sext. Turpilius, Licinius Imbrex, and Virgilius Romanus: so the best for Comedy amongst us bee, Edward Earle of Oxforde, Doctor Gager of Oxforde, Maister Rowley once a rare Scholler of learned Pembrooke Hall in Cambridge, Maister Edwardes one of her Majesties Chappell, eloquent and wittie John Lilly, Lodge, Gascoyne, Greene, Shakespeare, Thomas Nash, Thomas Heywood, Anthony Mundye our best plotter, Chapman, Porter, Wilson, Hathway, and Henry Chettle."

Notes

External links
Review of William Gager: The Complete Works
Hypertext edition of The Complete Works

1555 births
1622 deaths
English Renaissance dramatists
16th-century English writers
16th-century male writers
17th-century English writers
17th-century English male writers
People educated at Westminster School, London
Alumni of Christ Church, Oxford
16th-century English dramatists and playwrights
16th-century Latin-language writers
17th-century Latin-language writers
New Latin-language poets